In Greek mythology, Adamas ( means 'unconquerable') was a Phrygian participant during the Trojan War. He was the son of the Phrygian leader Asius, son of King Dymas, and brother of Phaenops. Adamas was killed by Meriones.

Note

References 

 Homer, The Iliad with an English Translation by A.T. Murray, Ph.D. in two volumes. Cambridge, MA., Harvard University Press; London, William Heinemann, Ltd. 1924. Online version at the Perseus Digital Library.
 Homer. Homeri Opera in five volumes. Oxford, Oxford University Press. 1920. Greek text available at the Perseus Digital Library.

Characters in Greek mythology